Matthew Hall (born April 24, 1990) is a former American football tackle. He played college football for Belhaven University and signed with the Minnesota Vikings as an undrafted free agent on May 10, 2014. Hall was released on July 25 and signed with the Colts on July 27.  He was waived with a triceps tear on August 30, and reverted to their injured reserve after going unclaimed.  Hall was waived by the Colts on May 4, 2015.

On August 10, 2015 Hall was claimed off of waivers by the Denver Broncos, but elected to retire rather than report to the team.

Hall is now in the Arkansas Law Enforcement Training Academy in the class of 2020-C and is the Squad Leader of the B Squad.

References

External links
 Indianapolis Colts bio
 Belhaven Blazers bio

1990 births
Living people
Belhaven Blazers football players
American football offensive tackles
Minnesota Vikings players
Indianapolis Colts players
People from Yell County, Arkansas